A dog biscuit is a hard, biscuit-based, dietary supplement for dogs or other canines, similar to human snack food.

Dog biscuits tend to be hard and dry, often sold in a flat bone-shape. The dry and hard biscuit texture helps clean the dog's teeth, promoting oral health.

History
"Dog's bread", made from bran, has been mentioned since at least Roman times. It was already criticized (as in later centuries) as particularly bad bread; Juvenal refers to dog's bread as "filth" - "And bit into the filth of a dog's bread" Et farris sordes mordere Canini.

In Spain, "pan de perro" is mentioned as early as 1623 in a play by Lope de Vega. It is used here in the sense of giving someone blows; to "give dog's bread" to someone could mean anything from mistreating them to killing them. The latter meaning refers to a special bread (also called zarazas) made with ground glass, poison and needles and intended to kill dogs.

The bread meant as food for dogs was also called parruna and was made from bran. This was very likely what was referred to in associating the bread with (non-fatal) mistreatment.

In France, Charles Estienne wrote in 1598: "Take no notice of bran bread,... it is better to leave it for the hunting, or shepherd, or watch dogs." By the nineteenth century, "pain de chien" had become a way of referring to very bad bread: "It is awful, general, they give us dog's bread!"
 
The English dog biscuit appears to be a nineteenth-century innovation: "With this may be joined farinaceous and vegetable articles — oat-meal, fine-pollard, dog-biscuit, potatoes, carrots, parsnips" (1827); "being in the neighbourhood of Maidenhead, I inspected Mr. Smith's dog-biscuit manufactory, and was surprised to find he has been for a long period manufacturing the enormous quantity of five tons a-week !" (1828)

In later years, dog biscuits began to be made of meat products and were sometimes treated as synonymous with dog food. In 1871, an ad appeared in Cassell's Illustrated Almanac for "SLATER'S MEAT BISCUIT FOR DOGS - Contains vegetable substances and about 25 per cent of Prepared Meat. It gives Dogs endurance, and without any other food will keep them in fine working condition."

In England, Spratt's Dog Biscuits not only obtained a patent but seems to have claimed to have invented the food:

 

In at least one case (in 1886) Spratt sued a seller accused of substituting another product - an early example of a company fighting "knock-offs":

Spratt lost in this case and the judge regretted that he could not grant the defendant court costs.

At one point after this, as an industrial product, dog biscuits were classified in the same category as soap: "Of the making of dog biscuits, which the census places in the same category with soap, as using animal refuse from which soap grease has been extracted, it is unnecessary to say much."

Spratt dominated the American market until 1907, when F. H. Bennett, whose own dog biscuits were faring poorly against those of the larger company, had the idea of making them in the shape of a bone. "His 'Maltoid Milk-Bones' were such a success that for the next fifteen years Bennett's Milk-Bone dominated the commercial dog food market in America." In 1931, the National Biscuit Company, now known as Nabisco, bought the company.

World's largest dog biscuit

The world's largest dog biscuit weighs 279.87 kg and was baked to be 2,000 larger than average by Hampshire Pet Products from Joplin, Missouri, US.

References

Dog nutrition
Pet foods
Biscuits